Jovon is a male given name. Notable people with the name include:

Jovon Johnson (born 1983), Canadian football player
Jovon Toppin (born 1989), Trinidadian sprinter

See also
Jevon
Joven (disambiguation)
Jovan (given name)

Masculine given names